Monkey Hunting is a 2003 novel by Cristina García.

The novel follows four generations of one family: Chen Pan, who leaves China in 1857 on the promise of success in Cuba only to find himself enslaved as an indentured worker; his Chinese granddaughter, Chen Fang, who is raised as a boy so that she can be educated (unbeknownst to her father, who has returned to Cuba as a doctor); and Chen Pan's great-grand-grandson Domingo, who moves with his father to the United States, where he enlists to fight in Vietnam.

Characters
Chen Pan: Chinese man who is tricked into indentured servitude in Cuba; after freeing himself, he becomes a successful businessman and learns to enjoy life in his new country
Lucrecia: a young mulatto slave girl, rescued by nuns and purchased by Chen Pan; she eventually becomes his lover and they have children together; she brings together Spanish and African religious practices, and eventually adds Buddhism to the mix; last in life, she considers herself Chinese
Lorenzo Chen: Chen Pan and Lucrecia's son; a successful doctor, he is the only child to express interest in China; on a visit there, he takes a wife and has daughters by her, the youngest of which (Chen Fang) is born after he returns to Cuba; he also takes a Cuban wife and through her becomes the grandfather of Domingo
Chen Fang: Lorenzo's youngest daughter by his Chinese wife; because Lorenzo never sees her, her mother tells him that she is a boy so that she might be educated; as an adult, she is successful as a teacher of foreign children until Mao's regime stops Western education and she is imprisoned; her gender identity is a source of confusion to her, both because she is raised as a boy and because her Afro-Cuban lineage makes her taller than Chinese girls; she has a happy affair with Dauphine, but never recovers after Dauphine has to leave the country
Dauphine
Pipo Chen
Domingo Chen
Tham Thanh Lan

Publication history
2003, USA, Knopf , Pub date 15 April 2003, hardback and paperback

External criticism 
 "A 'Chino' in Cuba: Cristina García's Monkey Hunting" By: Xiomara Campilongo, IN: Ignacio López-Calvo, Alternative Orientalisms in Latin America and Beyond. Newcastle upon Tyne, England: Cambridge Scholars, 2007. pp. 113–23
 "Chinos y japoneses en América Latina: Karen Tei Yamashita, Cristina García y Anna Kazumi Stahl"  By: Gustavo Geirola, Chasqui: Revista de Literatura Latinoamericana, 2005 Nov; 34 (2): 113-30.
 "La literatura cubanoamericana: Cristina García y su trilogía novelesca" By: Eliana Rivero, .  IN: Laura P. Alonso Gallo and Fabio Murrieta; Guayaba Sweet: Literatura Cubana en Estados Unidos. Cádiz, Spain: Aduana Vieja, 2003. pp. 133–51 (book article)
 Reading Latinas: A Cultural Analysis of Beauty, Gender and Empowering Models for and by Latinas  By: Emma R. García, ; Dissertation Abstracts International, Section A: The Humanities and Social Sciences, 2006 Feb; 66 (8): 2932. U of Michigan, 2005. (dissertation abstract)

2003 American novels
Novels by Cristina García
Alfred A. Knopf books
Hispanic and Latino American novels
Novels set in Cuba
Novels set in the Qing dynasty
Novels set in New York City
Novels set in Vietnam
Books with cover art by Chip Kidd
Novels set in the 19th century